Billie Myers (born 14 June 1971) is a British rock singer and songwriter from Coventry, England. She is known principally for her 1997 transatlantic hit "Kiss the Rain".

Biography
Myers was born in Coventry to a Jamaican father and English mother. Before commencing her career in music, Myers was a nurse and insurance agent. She was discovered in a club by record producer Peter Harris. Soon after their first meeting, Myers began writing material for her debut album, Growing, Pains (1997). The album was produced by Desmond Child. The first single from the album, "Kiss the Rain", became a Top 20 hit.

Myers was signed to a recording contract with Universal Records in 1997. Singles from Growing, Pains have appeared on television commercials and in the TV series, Dawson's Creek. Growing, Pains achieved gold record status in 1997, and Myers' follow-up album, Vertigo, was issued in 2000.

Her vocal style is a combination of pop, jazz and world music.

She was given a Brit Award nomination in 1999 for Best British Female Solo Artist alongside another Billie, Billie Piper (then known only by her first name), but neither won.

She has spoken about her bisexuality and the difficulties "not being gay enough" has caused her in the past.

On 11 October 2009, Myers sang "America the Beautiful" before a crowd of LGBT people and their allies at the National Equality March in Washington, D.C. In introducing the song, she criticised then-President Barack Obama for failing to mention marriage equality and the battle to ban same-sex marriage in Maine during his speech the previous night at a Human Rights Campaign dinner.

Myers has also spoken out numerous times publicly about living with depression. As well as being an ambassador for the Jed Foundation, Myers gave her support to the Mindfull initiative that aims to support young people dealing with mental health issues.

Growing, Pains (1997)
Myers's debut album, Growing, Pains, was released in the United States on 18 November 1997.  It achieved gold status, thanks in large part to the success of its first single. Myers wrote or co-wrote all songs featured on the record, and although she had not written songs prior to creating Growing, Pains, she had regularly written in journals and diaries for years beforehand, which facilitated the songwriting process.

Her first single, "Kiss the Rain" entered the UK Singles Chart and eventually reached number 4. In the United States, "Kiss the Rain" reached number 15 on the Billboard Hot 100 and spent 31 weeks on the chart. The American television series Dawson's Creek (episode #2-02, titled "Crossroads") featured "Kiss the Rain", and it was also used in promotions for Archer Daniels Midland, which were most often seen on both Sunday morning talk shows and ADM's underwriting spot for The NewsHour with Jim Lehrer.

The dance remix of "Kiss the Rain" was the first number 1 for both Myers and the remix team, Thunderpuss.

A remix, featuring clips from the Kevin Smith film Chasing Amy, was produced by Pablo, then a DJ at WABB-FM in Mobile, Alabama.

The follow-up single, "Tell Me", reached number 25 on the Hot Adult Top 40 Tracks chart. Myers admitted that once "Kiss the Rain" had retreated from charting position, she felt disappointed because "Tell Me" did not match the success of her first single.

After the release of Growing, Pains and before her second album, Myers scored the title track for the Freddie Prinze, Jr. film Down to You.

Vertigo (2000)
In June 2000, Myers released her second record, Vertigo, which featured the single "Am I Here Yet? (Return to Sender)".  The dance remix of "Am I Here Yet?" by DJ Junior Vasquez reached number 1 on the dance charts. "Should I Call You Jesus?" was the album's second single and invited controversy because of Myers's frank, honest questions about religion. Myers was satisfied with her second record because she was more assertive in the production process and more direct lyrically. Billboard called Vertigo'''s collection of songs "a fearless set that intertwines deft pop hooks, wickedly honest lyrics, and vibrant rhythms". Background vocals were sung by Elisa Fiorillo and Wendy Wright.

"Just Sex" (2005)
In November 2005, Myers released a single, "Just Sex", with Artemis Records' Star Struck compilation album. One year later, Myers was named the closing act for Los Angeles Gay Pride 2006 and a featured act for New York City Pride 2006.  She also appeared at the Chicago North Halsted Market Days 25th Anniversary Festival.  The remix of "Just Sex" reached number 8 on the Billboard Dance Chart.

Tea and Sympathy (2013)
Following a soft release to fans in 2009, Myers officially released her third album, Tea and Sympathy, in March 2013. Myers discussed the album at length in an electronic press kit video which featured on the official Billie Myers website. The album was a commercial failure, selling fewer than 100,000 copies world wide. This was her most recent studio album.

Discography

Studio albums
 Growing, Pains (1997) – UK No. 19, No. 91 US
 Vertigo (2000)
 Tea & Sympathy'' (2013)

Singles

Videos
 "Kiss the Rain" (1997)
 "Tell Me" (1998)
 "You Send Me Flying" (1999)
 "It All Comes Down to You" (1999)
 "Am I Here Yet? (Return to Sender)" (2000)
 "I Hope You're Happy Now" (2009)
 "Wonderful" (2010)

References

External links
 

Living people
1971 births
20th-century Black British women singers
21st-century Black British women singers
Bisexual singers
Bisexual songwriters
Bisexual women
English women pop singers
English women singer-songwriters
English nurses
English people of Jamaican descent
Black British rock musicians
Insurance agents
LGBT Black British people
English LGBT singers
English LGBT songwriters
Musicians from Coventry
Universal Records artists
21st-century English LGBT people
20th-century English LGBT people